Kungumam is a Tamil weekly entertainment magazine published in Chennai, India.

History
Kungumam was first published on 25 December 1977. The magazine is owned by Kalanidhi Maran's Sun Group. According to the Indian Readership Survey 2006 Kungumam emerged as the top-selling Tamil weekly magazine overtaking historical market leaders such as Kumudam and Ananda Vikatan. Also, Kungumam is the second best-selling magazine in national league tables, ranking behind the Hindi weekly Saras Saleel. "Best kanna best" is the tagline for the magazine commercial.

References

External links
 Official website

1977 establishments in Tamil Nadu
Weekly magazines published in India
Magazines established in 1977
Mass media in Chennai
Sun Group
Tamil-language magazines
Entertainment magazines